Lapu-lapu's sun skink (Eutropis lapulapu) is a species of skink found in the Philippines.

References

Eutropis
Reptiles described in 2020
Reptiles of the Philippines
Endemic fauna of the Philippines